The United States Army Intelligence and Security Command (INSCOM) is a direct reporting unit that conducts intelligence, security, and information operations for United States Army commanders, partners in the Intelligence Community, and national decision-makers. INSCOM is headquartered at Fort Belvoir, Virginia.

INSCOM is an organization within both the Army and the National Security Agency, the United States's unified signals intelligence (SIGINT) organization. Within the NSA, INSCOM and its counterparts in the Navy, Air Force, Space Force, Coast Guard, and Marine Corps comprise what is known as the Central Security Service. INSCOM's budget has been estimated to be approximately $6 billion.

As a direct reporting unit, INSCOM reports directly to the Chief of Staff of the Army, rather than higher echelons of command.

Mission
INSCOM collects intelligence information in all intelligence disciplines to provide unit commanders with intelligence for the battlefield and the focus of combat power. The organization also conducts intelligence production activities, ranging from intelligence preparation of the battlefield to situation development, SIGINT analysis, imagery exploitation, and science and technology intelligence production. INSCOM also has significant responsibilities in counterintelligence, force protection, electronic warfare, and information warfare. Additionally, INSCOM supports force modernization and training.

INSCOM's stated vision for operations includes: (1) conducting and supporting relevant intelligence, security and information operations for U.S. Army, joint and combined forces; (2) optimizing national/theater/tactical partnerships; (3) exploiting leading edge technology; and (4) meeting the challenge of today, tomorrow and the 21st Century.

Structure

  1st Information Operations Command (Land)
Located at Fort Belvoir, 1st IO CMD provides multi-disciplinary Information Operations (IO) support to the component and major commands of the United States Army.
  66th Military Intelligence Brigade
Located in Wiesbaden, Germany, the 66th conducts theater level multi-discipline intelligence and security operations and, when directed, deploys prepared forces to conduct joint/combined expeditionary and contingency operations in support of United States Army Europe and U.S. European Command.
  116th Military Intelligence Brigade (Aerial Intelligence)
Located at Fort Gordon, Georgia, the 116th conducts 24/7 tasking, collection, processing, exploitation, dissemination and feedback operations for multiple aerial-ISR systems utilizing the Distributed Common Ground System-Army (DCGS-A).
  207th Military Intelligence Brigade (Theater)
Located at Caserma Ederle and Caserma Longare, Vicenza, Italy. It conducts full-spectrum intelligence in support of U.S. Army Africa and United States Africa Command (USAFRICOM or AFRICOM) in order to set the intelligence architecture for the theater, disrupt transnational and trans-regional threats, and promote regional stability in Africa while building and maintaining intelligence readiness.
  300th Military Intelligence Brigade (Linguist)
Provides trained and ready linguist and military intelligence soldiers to commanders from brigade through Army level. Located in Draper, Utah.
  470th Military Intelligence Brigade
Located at Fort Sam Houston, Texas, the 470th provides timely and fused multi-discipline intelligence in support of United States Army South, U.S. Southern Command, and other national intelligence agencies.
  500th Military Intelligence Brigade
The 500th Military Intelligence Brigade located at Schofield Barracks, Hawaii, provides multi-disciplined intelligence support for joint and coalition war fighters within United States Army Pacific and the U.S. Pacific Command area of responsibility.
  501st Military Intelligence Brigade
The 501st Military Intelligence Brigade supports combined forces operations in Korea.
  513th Military Intelligence Brigade
Located at Fort Gordon, Georgia, the 513th deploys in strength or in tailored elements to conduct multi-disciplined intelligence and security operations in support of United States Army Central, U.S. Central Command, U.S. Southern Command, and other theater Army commands.
  704th Military Intelligence Brigade
Conducts synchronized full-spectrum signals intelligence, computer network and information assurance operations directly and through the National Security Agency to satisfy national, joint, combined and Army information superiority requirements.
  706th Military Intelligence Group
Formerly the 116th Military Intelligence Group, it is located at Fort Gordon, Georgia. It provides personnel, intelligence assets and technical support to conduct signals intelligence operations within the National Security Agency/Central Security Service Georgia (NSA/CSS Georgia) and worldwide.
  780th Military Intelligence Brigade
Located at Fort Meade, the 780th conducts expeditionary and remote cyber attack, cyber exploitation, and cyber defense operations of Army and Defense information networks.
  902nd Military Intelligence Group
Provides direct and general counterintelligence support to Army activities and major commands.
 Army Cryptologic Office (ACO)
Located at Fort Meade, ACO serves as the Army G2 and Service Cryptologic Component (SCC) representative to provide expert cryptologic leadership, support, guidance and advice to U.S. Army Warfighters and Intelligence leaders. Lead the Army’s Cryptologic effort to satisfy Signals Intelligence (SIGINT) requirements by leveraging NSA Extended Enterprise, Intelligence Community, Sister Services and Service Laboratories. Ensure timely and effective support to operations by providing optimized capabilities, training and resources.
 Army Field Support Center (AFSC)
Located at Fort Meade, AFSC provides specialized operational, administrative and personnel management support to Department of the Army and other Department of Defense Services and Agencies as directed.
 Army Operations Group (AOG)
Located at Fort Meade, AOG conducts Human Intelligence (HUMINT) operations and provide expertise in support of ground component priority intelligence requirements using a full spectrum of human intelligence collection methods.
 Central Clearance Facility (CCF)
Located at Fort Meade, the CCF serves as the U.S. Army’s executive agency for personnel security determinations in support of Army missions world-wide.
  National Ground Intelligence Center
Located in Charlottesville, Virginia, NGIC is the Defense Department's primary producer of ground forces technical intelligence and is the Army's premier provider of intelligence products.
  Army Geospatial Intelligence Battalion (AGB) Located in the National Geospatial-Intelligence Agency headquarters on Fort Belvoir, Virginia, AGB is the primary source for Army geospatial intelligence products and joint GEOINT operations.

History

Merger and creation of INSCOM
On 1 January 1977, the United States Army Intelligence and Security Command (INSCOM) was organized at Arlington Hall Station, Virginia, to provide the U.S. Army with a single organization for conducting multi-discipline intelligence, security operations, and electronic warfare at the level above corps. The new organization merged the former U.S. Army Security Agency, the signal intelligence and signal security organizations previously located at Arlington Hall, Virginia, the U.S. Army Intelligence Agency, a counterintelligence and human intelligence agency based at Fort Meade, Maryland, and several intelligence production units formerly controlled by the Assistant Chief of Staff for Intelligence and U.S. Army Forces Command. Brigadier General (later Major General) William I. Rolya, former commanding general of the Army Security Agency, became INSCOM's first commanding general.

On 1 October 1977, the former U.S. Army Intelligence Agency headquarters was integrated into INSCOM. The command established a unified intelligence production element, the Intelligence and Threat Analysis Center, on 1 January 1978. Additionally, INSCOM assumed command of three military intelligence groups located overseas: the 66th Military Intelligence Group in Germany, the 470th Military Intelligence Group in Panama, and the 500th Military Intelligence Group in Japan. These groups were transformed into multidisciplinary units by incorporating former Army Security Agency assets into the previously existing elements. A fourth such group, the 501st Military Intelligence Brigade, was soon organized in South Korea. All of these groups were eventually reorganized and re-designated as brigades.

Parapsychologic research
In association with the Defense Intelligence Agency, and under the leadership of commanding general Albert Stubblebine, INSCOM attempted to use parapsychologic methods such as remote viewing in operation Center Lane. This was done as late as 1981. Other U.S. intelligence services attempted similar projects during the same period, most notably the Stargate Project by the Central Intelligence Agency.

List of commanding generals

References

External links
 
 INSCOM news website
 INSCOM History
 66th Military Intelligence Brigade homepage
 470th Military Intelligence Brigade homepage
 500th Military Intelligence Brigade homepage
 513th Military Intelligence Brigade homepage

Intelligence and Security Command